Theodore Ward Chanler (April 29, 1902 – July 27, 1961) was an American composer.

Early life
Chanler was born on April 29, 1902 in Newport, Rhode Island. He was a son of Major Winthrop Astor Chanler and Margaret Ward (née Terry) Chanler, an author and musician. Theodore's godfather was President Theodore Roosevelt, who attended his christening in Newport in 1902.  Though born in Newport, his family shortly moved to Geneseo, New York where he grew up at the family estate, Sweet Briar Farms. 

His paternal grandparents were Margaret Astor (née Ward) Chanler (1838–1875), a member of the Astor family, and John Winthrop Chanler (1826–1877), a U.S. Representative from New York.  His maternal grandparents were Louisa (née Ward) Crawford Terry and artist Luther Terry (d. 1900). His grandmother was a half-sister of F. Marion Crawford and a niece of Julia Ward Howe. 

Chanler studied piano while a youngster in Boston, and then studied piano under Buhling and counterpoint under Goetschius at the Institute of Musical Art in New York City. From 1920 to 1923, he studied at the Cleveland Institute of Music, and between 1924 and 1927 in Europe (Oxford, then Paris under Nadia Boulanger).

Career
He became a music critic for the Boston Herald in 1934, and taught in Massachusetts in the 1940s and 1950s.  He was also a regular contributor to the American magazine Modern Music.

Chanler's best-known works are his songs, which number about 50.  He also composed a ballet, an opera (The Pot of Fat, 1955), choral pieces, works for chamber ensemble, and piano solo pieces.  In 1940, he was awarded the League of Composers Town Hall Award for his song cycle, "Four Rhymes from Peacock Pie" and, in 1944, was the recipient of a Guggenheim fellowship.

Teaching career
From 1945 to 1947, he was on the faculty of the Peabody Conservatory in Baltimore.  He also taught at the Longy School of Music of Bard College in Cambridge, Massachusetts.

Personal life
In Paris in 1931, Chanler was married to Maria Sargent (née de Acosta) (1880–1970), the daughter of Ricardo de Acosta.  She was the sister of Aida de Acosta, Mercedes de Acosta, Rita de Acosta, and Mrs. Frederick Shaw of London. Maria previously was married to Andrew Robeson Sargent, the son of Charles Sprague Sargent.  Maria and Andrew had a child together, Ignatius Sargent (1914–1999), who attended the Groton School and was a member of the class of 1937 at Harvard University. He married Frances Moffat in 1935.

Chanler died at the Massachusetts General Hospital in Boston on July 27, 1961.

References
Notes

Sources

1902 births
1961 deaths
American male classical composers
American classical composers
20th-century classical composers
Musicians from Newport, Rhode Island
Alumni of the University of Oxford
American music critics
20th-century American non-fiction writers
20th-century American composers
20th-century American male musicians
Chanler family